Hervé Guy Landry Bi Bola (born 17 September 1991), is an Ivorian professional footballer who plays as a defensive midfielder for Botola club Fath Union Sport.

Club career
Guy began his career in the youth ranks of French club SC Bastia and played his first game on 1 February 2003 against AC Ajaccio. He was permanently promoted in 2006 to the Ligue 2 team from SC Bastia. In summer 2007, he left SC Bastia and became a free agent. After a year, he was signed by Stella Club d'Adjamé in the Ligue 1 (Ivory Coast). He spent about five years with the club before becoming a free agent again in February 2013. In July of that year, he was signed by Moroccan club Ittihad Tanger. In July 2017, Guy has been transferred to Saudi Arabian club Al-Qadsiah FC. He made his league debut for the club on 11 August 2017 in a 2–1 victory over Al-Raed FC.

International career
Guy represented the Ivory Coast U-20 team at the 2003 FIFA World Youth Championship in the United Arab Emirates.

References

External links 
 Profile on Eurosport
 2003 FIFA World Youth Championship squads
 

1991 births
Living people
Ivorian footballers
Ivorian expatriate footballers
SC Bastia players
Stella Club d'Adjamé players
Ittihad Tanger players
Al-Qadsiah FC players
Bhayangkara F.C. players
SCC Mohammédia players
Fath Union Sport players
Ligue 1 (Ivory Coast) players
Botola players
Saudi Professional League players
Liga 1 (Indonesia) players
Ivory Coast under-20 international footballers
Ivorian expatriate sportspeople in France
Expatriate footballers in France
Ivorian expatriate sportspeople in Morocco
Expatriate footballers in Morocco
Ivorian expatriate sportspeople in Saudi Arabia
Expatriate footballers in Saudi Arabia
Ivorian expatriate sportspeople in Indonesia
Expatriate footballers in Indonesia
People from Adzopé
Association football midfielders